Mr. and Mrs. Chinnathirai (மிஸ்டர் அண்ட் மிசஸ் சின்னத்திரை) is an 2019 Indian Tamil-language reality television show airs on Star Vijay and streamed on Disney+ Hotstar. Over three years, Mr. and Mrs. Chinnathirai has rolled out four seasons and Ma Ka Pa Anand continued as a host for four seasons. and Aranthangi Nisha continued as a host for three seasons. Devadarshini and Gopinath Chandran as the judges for four seasons.

This show features married couple of the Tamil television industry. Through this show, they will display their talents and skills. The first season was premiered on 20 January 2019.

Overview

Judges and Hosts

Judges

Host

Contestants

Season 1
The first season aired on every Sunday at 18:30 from 20 January to 19 May 2019 and ended with 16 Episodes. Gopinath Chandran, Devadarshini and Vijayalakshmi Feroz as the judges, television host Ma Ka Pa Anand as the host. The winner of the season was Television Actor Shankara Pandian and his Wife Jaya Bharathi. Gaana Singer Anthony Daasan and his wife Reetha was the runner-up.

Contestants
 Senthil Ganesh and Rajalakshmy
 Both of them are well known from the show Super Singer. And Senthil was a title winner of the show.

 Manimegalai and Hussain
 They were been a love marriage couple and her parents have never accepted their marriage. Manimegalai is a Television Host. Hussain is an choreographer.

 Farina and Rahman
 Farina is a Television actress and host. She known for playing the role the serial Bharathi Kannamma. Rahman is an ad film director.

 Aranthangi Nisha and Riyaz 
 Riyaz and Nisha have been also a loved marriage couple. Their intro section was fun filled. Nisha is a Comedy actress.

 Shankara Pandian and Jaya Bharathi
 Shankara Pandian was one of an important actor in Saravanan Meenatchi (season 3). He was well known for his village slang and performance. Jaya Bharathi is a teacher and she it was her first dance performer.

 Anthony Daasan and Reetha 
 Indian folk singer, who is currently working in the Tamil film industry.

 Thangadurai and Aruna
 Thangadurai is well known for his "Palaya joke" Thangadurai. He is well known for his performance in the show "Athu Ithu Ethu".

 Dhiraviam and Rithu
 Thiraviyam is one of the lead in the serial as Eeramana Rojave.

 Priya and Prince
 Priya is a serial actress. She known for playing the role the serial Tamil Kadavul Murugan.

 Subarnan and Priya
 Subarnan is a serial actors and that's a love marriage between them. They were been married since 2005.

Episodes

Season 2
The second season aired on every Saturday Sunday at 21:30 from 8 March to 11 October 2020 and ended with 18 Episodes. Ma Ka Pa Anand has officially once again been appointed as the host for the second time. Aranthangi Nisha as the second host. The winner of the season was Vinoth babu and his wife Sindhu.

Contestants
 Kumaran Thangarajan and Suhasinni
 Kumaran Thangarajan is an Tamil Actor and Dancer, who predominantly works in television industry. He made his acting debut in the Tamil serial Mappillai.

 Vinoth Babu and Hemalatha Sindhu
 Vinoth Babu is best known for his work in the TV show 'Adhu Idhu Edhu Adhu Idhu Edhu' and Sundari Neeyum Sundaran Naanum serial on Vijay TV. 

 KPY Ramar and Krishnammal
 Ramar is a Tamil Television actor and comedian. He is best known for his work in the TV show 'Adhu Idhu Edhu Adhu Idhu Edhu' on Star Vijay.

 Ramya NSK and Sathya
 Ramya NSK is an Indian playback singer, who has predominantly sung for Tamil language and films. Sathya is a Tamil Television Actor.

 TSK – Vaishnavi
 stand-up comedian who is popularly known as a contestant on popular comedy reality show telecast by Vijay TV Kalakka Povathu Yaaru.

 Vadivel Balaji - Jyothilakshmi
 Vadivel Balaji is an actor,comedian who is popularly known as in Kolamaavu Kokila Tamil flim and on popular comedy reality show telecast by Vijay Television 'Adhu Idhu Edhu' & 'Kalakka Povadhu Yaaru'

 KPY Palani and Sangeetha
 Palani is a stand-up comedian who is popularly known as a contestant on popular comedy reality show telecast by Vijay Television 'Kalakka Povadhu Yaaru Season 5'. 

 Syed Anwar Ahmed and Sameera Sherief
 Syed Anwar is an Indian Television actor and Film producer. In 2011, he made acting and production debut in Tamil Television with Pirivom Santhippom. Sameera Sherief is an Indian television actress and producer who acted in Tamil serial Rekka Katti Parakkudhu Manasu in 2018.

 Murugan and Kirushnaveni
 Murugan is one of the Super Singer 7. 

 Sharmila Thapa and Raghu
 Sharmila Thapa is an Indian actress, VJ as well as an anchor, who is predominantly working in Tamil film along with television industry. Raghu is an choreographer.

 Anjali and Pirabakar
 Kannan is a contestant on popular comedy reality show telecast by Vijay TV 'Kalakka Povadhu Yaaru Season 8'. Anjali is also acting in the Vijay TV serial Thaenmozhi B.A.

Season 3
The third Season of Mr and Mrs Chinnathirai started on 24 April 2021 and ended on 12 December 2021with 58 Episodes. The show main hosted by Ma Ka Pa Anand and Archana Chandhoke. Aranthangi Nisha, Manimegalai and Bala as special hosts. Gopinath Chandran and Devadarshini has officially once again been appointed as the Judges for the third time. The winner of the season was Sarath and his wife Krithika. The top 6 were Sarath & Krithika, Yogesh & Myna Nandhini, Jack & Roshini, Yuvraj & Gayathri, Vinoth & Aishwarya and Rajmohan & Kavitha.

Contestants
 Sarath and Krithika
 Sarath is an stand-up comedian who is popularly known as a contestant on popular comedy reality show telecast by Vijay TV Kalakka Povathu Yaaru.

 Shankar and Deepa Shankar 
 Deepa Shankar is an Tamil Television and Film actress. Deepa has worked in movies like Maayandi Kudumbathar (2009) and Kadaikutty Singam (2018).

 Yogesh and Myna Nandhini
 Tamil actress and television personality, who is best known as Myna Revathi in Saravanan Meenatchi (season 2), Alabarai Myna in Chinna Thambi. Yogesh is an Tamil Television Actor.

 Vinoth and Aishwarya
 Vinoth is an stand-up comedian who is popularly known as a contestant on popular comedy reality show telecast by Vijay TV Kalakka Povathu Yaaru.

 Yuvraj and Gayathri	
Gayathri is an Tamil Television actress. Yuvraj is an choreographer.

 Ajay and Anandhi
 Anandhi is a Tamil Television actress. She known for playing the role the serial Thalayanai Pookal.

 Diwakar and Abhinaya
 Tamil playback singer and live performer. He is best known for winning season 4 of Airtel Super Singer,

 Jack and Roshini
 playback singer who originally hails from Tamil Nadu. She contested in the seventh season of Tamil reality show Super Singer in Vijay TV.

 Manikandan and Sofia
 Manikandan is an Television Actor, He known for playing the role the serial Azhagu. 

 Velmurugan and Kala
 Tamil film playback singer. He is known for folk songs including Madura in Subramaniapuram and Aadungada in Naadodigal and Otha Sollala in Aadukalam.

 Rajmohan and Kavitha	
 Tamil social activist, YouTuber, actor, and director

 Badava Gopi and Haritha
 Tamil stand-up comedian, Voice actor and actor.

Contestants Status

Season 4
The fourth season of Mr and Mrs Chinnathirai was hosted by Ma Ka Pa Anand and Aranthangi Nisha, which ran from 2 July 2022 to 20 November 2022 with 39 Episodes. Gopinath Chandran and Devadarshini has officially once again been appointed as the Judges for the fourth time. These eight new couples will compete in every challenge to avoid elimination and become the winner of Mr and Mrs Chinnathirai Season 4. The winner of the season was Mahalingam and his wife Rajeshwari. The fourth season of the final episode was aired on 20 November 2022 at 15:00.

 Title Winner of Mr & Mrs Chinnathirai Season 4: Mahalingam and Rajeshwari 
 First Runners-Up: Madhan and Reshma 
 Second Runners-Up: Rehman & Fareena and Vasanth & Rekha
 4th Ram and Jaanu
 5th Deepan and Suganya

Contestants Status

Adaptations

References

External links
 

Star Vijay original programming
Tamil-language television shows
Tamil-language game shows
Tamil-language reality television series
2019 Tamil-language television series debuts
Television shows set in Tamil Nadu
2019 Tamil-language television seasons
2020 Tamil-language television seasons
2021 Tamil-language television seasons
2022 Tamil-language television seasons